Tyrone Smith (born 7 August 1984 in Paget Parish) is a professional Bermudian born long jumper.

Tyrone grew up in the Chicago suburb of North Chicago where he attended NCCHS and Novak-King Middle School. At NCCHS he was a member of the track and field team as well as the football team. Following high school he pursued a collegiate career in both sports at the University of Missouri-Rolla (UMR), now the Missouri University of Science and Technology, eventually deciding after his freshman year to concentrate in track and field. Tyrone Is a 3 time NCAA Division II All-American in the long jump.  He holds the school records at both the indoor and outdoor long jump.  He won Bermuda's Athlete of the Year three times, 2011, 2012 and 2013.

Tyrone is now represented by Kallas Management.

He has competed at the 2008 World Indoor Championships and the 2008 Olympic Games without reaching the final. He competed in the 2010 Commonwealth Games for Bermuda.  Smith reached the finals of the 2012 Olympic Games.

Smith competed for Bermuda at the 2016 Summer Olympics in long jump, but did not qualify for the finals. He was the flag bearer for Bermuda during the Parade of Nations.

Personal bests
His personal best jump is 8.34 metres, achieved 5 May 2017 on a gold medal winning performance in Houston, Texas, USA. This is the Bermuda National Record.

Achievements

References

External links

Official Website

1984 births
Living people
Track and field athletes from Chicago
Bermudian emigrants to the United States
Bermudian long jumpers
Athletes (track and field) at the 2008 Summer Olympics
Athletes (track and field) at the 2012 Summer Olympics
Athletes (track and field) at the 2016 Summer Olympics
Olympic athletes of Bermuda
Pan American Games competitors for Bermuda
Athletes (track and field) at the 2007 Pan American Games
Athletes (track and field) at the 2015 Pan American Games
Athletes (track and field) at the 2019 Pan American Games
Commonwealth Games competitors for Bermuda
Athletes (track and field) at the 2010 Commonwealth Games
Athletes (track and field) at the 2014 Commonwealth Games
Athletes (track and field) at the 2018 Commonwealth Games
Competitors at the 2010 Central American and Caribbean Games
Competitors at the 2014 Central American and Caribbean Games
Competitors at the 2018 Central American and Caribbean Games
Central American and Caribbean Games gold medalists for Bermuda
Central American and Caribbean Games silver medalists for Bermuda
Male long jumpers
Bermudian male athletes
People from Paget Parish
World Athletics Championships athletes for Bermuda
People from North Chicago, Illinois
Missouri University of Science and Technology alumni
Central American and Caribbean Games medalists in athletics